The Newmarket Hurricanes were a Junior "A" ice hockey team from Newmarket, Ontario.  They played in the Ontario Junior Hockey League. The franchise existed from 1972 until 2019, based in Newmarket starting in 1975.

History
In 1972, the Seneca Flyers became a part of the OPJHL.  In 1975, they bought out the Newmarket Redmen of the Mid-Ontario Junior B Hockey League and moved to become the Newmarket Flyers. The Redmen dated back to the 1920s and were at one point a top level Junior "C" team.

Although the official story is that the Hurricanes got their start in the late 1980s as the Newmarket 87's, the franchise that spawned this team existed long before it. In 1986, the Newmarket Flyers folded. The OHA Junior "A" league was on rocky footing in the late 1980s and was no longer cost efficient for most member teams.  Sensing the demise of the league, the Flyers went on hiatus.  The league folded in 1987, their last champions happened to be the longtime Junior "B" team: Owen Sound Greys. As more Junior A teams had folded from the OHA-A, the more Junior "B" teams came in to fill the void. As the league ran almost completely out of original Junior "A" teams, the league decided it would be best to fold. The result was a mass expansion of local Junior "B" leagues—filling with both still-active teams and teams that had folded due to problems in the OHA-A.  Newmarket pulled its franchise back together and joined the Central Junior "B" Hockey League as the 87's. After 1997, the 87's became the Hurricanes.

The 87's never did very well as a member of the Central "B", but no team exactly stacked up well to the powerhouse Barrie Colts who most notably pulled off an undefeated season in 1992-93. After the formation of the Ontario Provincial Junior "A" league in 1993, things started clicking for the franchise.  They have never ranked less than 10th in a 37 team league, with 3 first place finishes in the regular season. They have also pulled off three seasons with less than 10 losses in the OPJHL.

Their best season was the 1995-96 season, after the Colts expanded into the Ontario Hockey League. The 87's finished in third place, won the Buckland Cup as league champions, and then took the Dudley Hewitt Cup as Central Canadian Junior "A" Champions.  At the inaugural Royal Bank Cup in 1996 at Melfort, Saskatchewan, the 87's finished off in the round robin in second place with a 2-2 record.  They defeated the BCHL's Vernon Vipers 7-5 in their first game. They then took out the SJHL's Yorkton Terriers 5-2. In the third game, the 87's were up against the only other undefeated team—the host, the SJHL's Melfort Mustangs.  The Mustangs deflated the high-flying 87's with an 11-3 blow-out. Melfort finished perfect in the round robin, but the 87's lost to the MJAHL's Moncton Beavers, 4-3, the first win for the Beavers in the tournament. The Moncton victory still left them eliminated from the tournament. Also, due to a tie breaker the 87's were still in second place. They ended up playing the Vipers again in the semi-final and lost by an uninspired score of 7-4. The Vipers knocked off the undefeated Mustangs 2-0 in the final.

In the 2005-06 season, the Hurricanes finished 7th overall in the league and 2nd place in the North Division with 32 wins. The Canes opened the playoffs with a 4 games to 1 series victory of the inconsistent Huntsville-Muskoka Otters. The Canes played the division semi-final against the Stouffville Spirit. The Spirit won the series in 6 games, beat the Aurora Tigers for the division title in 6 games, beat the Oakville Blades in 7 games in the Buckland Cup semi-final, but were out-lasted by the defending champion St. Michael's Buzzers 4 games to 2 in the league final.

On June 28, 2008 the Newmarket Hurricanes lost a key part of their team. Player KJ Ramolla died as a passenger in a single car rollover. Ramolla was 5th for scoring during the 2007-2008 season and was set to return for the 2008-2009 season. The driver of the car, Ryan Burkholder, former captain of the Hurricanes survived the crash with minor injuries.

Newmarket hosted the 2008 Dudley Hewitt Cup, losing to the OJHL Champion Oakville Blades in the Final.

In March 2019, the OJHL franchise was bought and moved to Milton. The team became the Milton Menace.

Season-by-season results

Playoffs
Original OPJHL
1973 Lost Quarter-final
Dixie Beehives defeated Seneca Flyers 4-games-to-3
1974 Lost Quarter-final
Aurora Tigers defeated Seneca Flyers 4-games-to-2
1975 Lost Semi-final
Seneca Flyers defeated North Bay Trappers 4-games-to-2
Toronto Nationals defeated Seneca Flyers 4-games-to-none
1976 Lost Preliminary
Weston Dodgers defeated Newmarket Flyers 3-games-to-2
1977 DNQ
1978 Lost Quarter-final
Royal York Royals defeated Newmarket Flyers 4-games-to-2
1979 Lost Quarter-final
North Bay Trappers defeated Newmarket Flyers 4-games-to-2
1980 DNQ
1981 DNQ
1982 Lost Quarter-final
Richmond Hill Rams defeated Newmarket Flyers 4-games-to-3
1983 Lost Semi-final
Newmarket Flyers defeated Richmond Hill Rams 4-games-to-3
Orillia Travelways defeated Newmarket Flyers 4-games-to-3
1984 Lost Semi-final
Newmarket Flyers defeated Hamilton Mountain A's 4-games-to-none
Dixie Beehives defeated Newmarket Flyers 4-games-to-3
1985 Lost Semi-final
Newmarket Flyers defeated Richmond Hill Dynes 4-games-to-2
Aurora Tigers defeated Newmarket Flyers 4-games-to-3
1986 Lost Semi-final
Orillia Travelways defeated Newmarket Flyers 4-games-to-1
OJHL Years
1994 Lost Semi-final
Newmarket 87's defeated Peterborough Jr. Petes 4-games-to-none
Newmarket 87's defeated Barrie Colts 4-games-to-1
Orillia Terriers defeated Newmarket 87's 4-games-to-1
1995 Lost Semi-final
Newmarket 87's defeated Peterborough Jr. Petes 4-games-to-none
Newmarket 87's defeated Cobourg Cougars 4-games-to-none
Barrie Colts defeated Newmarket 87's 4-games-to-3
1996 Won League, Won OHA Buckland Cup, Won OHF Ruddock Trophy, Won Dudley Hewitt Cup, Lost 1996 Royal Bank Cup semi-final
Newmarket 87's defeated Cobourg Cougars 4-games-to-3
Newmarket 87's defeated Orillia Terriers 4-games-to-1
Newmarket 87's defeated Lindsay Muskies 4-games-to-3
Newmarket 87's defeated Brampton Capitals 4-games-to-2 OPJHL CHAMPIONS
Second in Dudley Hewitt Cup round robin (2-2) RUDDUCK TROPHY CHAMPIONS
Newmarket 87's defeated Thunder Bay Flyers (USHL) 6-3 in semi-final
Newmarket 87's defeated Brampton Capitals 8-2 in final BUCKLAND CUP, DUDLEY HEWITT CUP CHAMPIONS
Second in 1996 Royal Bank Cup round robin (2-2)
Vernon Vipers (BCHL) defeated Newmarket 87's 7-4 in semi-final
1997 Lost Final
Newmarket 87's defeated Bowmanville Eagles 4-games-to-2
Newmarket 87's defeated Collingwood Blues 4-games-to-none
Newmarket 87's defeated Kingston Voyageurs 4-games-to-1
Milton Merchants defeated Newmarket 87's 4-games-to-3
1998 Lost Quarter-final
Newmarket Hurricanes defeated Aurora Tigers 4-games-to-1
Couchiching Terriers defeated Newmarket Hurricanes 4-games-to-1
1999 Lost Division Semi-final
Newmarket Hurricanes defeated Wexford Raiders 3-games-to-1
Couchiching Terriers defeated Newmarket Hurricanes 4-games-to-1
2000 Lost Division Semi-final
Newmarket Hurricanes defeated Wexford Raiders 3-games-to-1
Couchiching Terriers defeated Newmarket Hurricanes 4-games-to-1
2001 Lost Division Final
Newmarket Hurricanes defeated Durham Huskies 4-games-to-none
Newmarket Hurricanes defeated Collingwood Blues 4-games-to-1
Couchiching Terriers defeated Newmarket Hurricanes 4-games-to-3
2002 Lost Division Final
Newmarket Hurricanes defeated Huntsville Wildcats 4-games-to-none
Newmarket Hurricanes defeated Collingwood Blues 4-games-to-1
Aurora Tigers defeated Newmarket Hurricanes 4-games-to-none
2003 Lost Division Semi-final
Newmarket Hurricanes defeated Ajax Axemen 4-games-to-1
Stouffville Spirit defeated Newmarket Hurricanes 4-games-to-3
2004 Lost Division Final
Newmarket Hurricanes defeated Pickering Panthers 4-games-to-none
Newmarket Hurricanes defeated Stouffville Spirit 4-games-to-1
Aurora Tigers defeated Newmarket Hurricanes 4-games-to-none
2005 Lost Division Final
Newmarket Hurricanes defeated Streetsville Derbys 4-games-to-none
Newmarket Hurricanes defeated Stouffville Spirit 4-games-to-2
Aurora Tigers defeated Newmarket Hurricanes 4-games-to-2
2006 Lost Division Semi-final
Newmarket Hurricanes defeated Huntsville-Muskoka Otters 4-games-to-1
Stouffville Spirit defeated Newmarket Hurricanes 4-games-to-2
2007 Lost Division Semi-final
Newmarket Hurricanes defeated Huntsville-Muskoka Otters 4-games-to-1
Aurora Tigers defeated Newmarket Hurricanes 4-games-to-2
2008 Lost Division Semi-final, Hosted and Lost Dudley Hewitt Cup Final
Aurora Tigers defeated Newmarket Hurricanes 4-games-to-1
Second in Dudley Hewitt Cup round robin (2-1)
Newmarket Hurricanes defeated Dryden Ice Dogs (SIJHL) 2-1 OT in semi-final
Oakville Blades defeated Newmarket Hurricanes 6-3 in final
2009 Lost Division Semi-final
Newmarket Hurricanes defeated Hamilton Red Wings 4-games-to-1
Wellington Dukes defeated Newmarket Hurricanes 4-games-to-none
2010 Won CCHL, Lost OHA Buckland Cup
Newmarket Hurricanes defeated St. Michael's Buzzers 4-games-to-1
Newmarket Hurricanes defeated Hamilton Red Wings 4-games-to-none
Newmarket Hurricanes defeated Burlington Cougars 4-games-to-none
Newmarket Hurricanes defeated Bowmanville Eagles 4-games-to-2 CCHL CHAMPIONS
Oakville Blades (OJAHL) defeated Newmarket Hurricanes 4-games-to-2
2011 Lost Quarter-final
Newmarket Hurricanes defeated Orangeville Flyers 4-games-to-1
Stouffville Spirit defeated Newmarket Hurricanes 4-games-to-3
2012 Lost Quarter Final
Newmarket Hurricanes defeated Markham Waxers 4-games-to-2
Stouffville Spirit defeated Newmarket Hurricanes 4-games-to-3
2013 Lost Final
Newmarket Hurricanes defeated Whitby Fury 4-games-to-2
Newmarket Hurricanes defeated Lindsay Muskies 4-games-to-0
Newmarket Hurricanes defeated Kingston Voyageurs 4-games-to-3
St. Michael's Buzzers defeated Newmarket Hurricanes 4-games-to-3

Newmarket Redmen

The Newmarket Redmen and Newmarket Smoke Rings were different names of a Canadian junior hockey franchise that won four Clarence Schmalz Cups as Ontario Hockey Association Junior C champions.  Based in Newmarket, Ontario, alongside rival Aurora Tigers, the (Smoke Rings or Smokies) spent their time in the Suburban Junior C Group.  They changed their name to the Redmen in 1960 when the team accepted promotion to the Metro Junior B Hockey League.

Formed in 1955 as a Junior C team in the Suburban Junior C Group, the Smoke Rings would win provincial titles in three of their first four seasons (1956, 1958, and 1959).

From 1961 to 1970, the Redmen played in the newly formed Suburban Junior C Hockey League.  In 1970, after winning a fourth provincial title, the team became a founding member of the Mid-Ontario Junior B Hockey League.  After five seasons at Junior B, the Newmarket Redmen merged with the Seneca Flyers to form the Junior A Newmarket Flyers.

Statistics

Clarence Schmalz Cup appearances
1956: Newmarket Smoke Rings defeated Stamford Bruins 3-games-to-none
1958: Newmarket Smoke Rings defeated Fort Erie 4-games-to-1
1959: Newmarket Smoke Rings defeated Fort Erie 4-games-to-2
1962: Elmira Polar Kings defeated Newmarket Redmen 4-games-to-none
1970: Newmarket Redmen defeated Hespeler Shamrocks 4-games-to-none

Notable alumni

Jeff Beukeboom
B.J. Crombeen
Rob Dopson
Dan Ellis
Dave Gagner
Lee Giffin
Mike Glumac
Ernie Godden
Steven Halko
Jeff Jackson
Curtis Joseph
Claude Julien
Mike Keating
Corey Locke
Jamie Macoun
Darrin Madeley
David McIntyre
Chris McRae
Wayne Rutledge
Geoff Sarjeant
John Stevens
Paul Ysebaert
Zack Stortini

References

External links
Newmarket Hurricanes, copy archived on March 27, 2017

Ontario Provincial Junior A Hockey League teams
Sport in Newmarket, Ontario